Mai Xuân Hợp (born 14 December 1986 in Thanh Hóa, Vietnam) is Vietnamese former player and football manager. He was a member of Vietnam Olympic played at 2009 Southeast Asian Games. His favourite positions are centre back and full back.

Early life 
Mai Xuân Hợp came from a football family. His father Mai Xuân Thanh was an amateur footballer, His passion for football made him determined for his son to become a quality player. He applied Hợp to football class and brought him proper training equipments.

Club career

Halida Thanh Hóa 
He played for Thanh Hóa youth team in four years from 2001–2005. later on he signed a professional contract with the club and immediately became an important member of the team.

Thể Công 
In November 2008, a month after winning the 2008 Merdeka Cup with U22 Vietnam, Mai Xuân Hợp officially signed a three-year contract with Thể Công for a transfer fee of 3.5 billion Vietnamese đồng, which was selling transfer record of the club at that moment. At that time, even though Hợp never wanted to leave the club but due to financial crisis, Thanh Hóa is forced to sell their best players.

Mai Xuân Hợp made his debut for Thể Công in the first match of 2009 season against Hà Nội T&T F.C., however, he couldn't establish a regular starting position for the rest of the season.

International career 
Mai Xuân Hợp made his debut for Vietnam in 2008.

References

External links 
 
 Nước mắt Mai Xuân Hợp

1986 births
Living people
People from Thanh Hóa province
Vietnamese footballers
Association football defenders
Vietnam international footballers
V.League 1 players
Thanh Hóa FC players
Becamex Binh Duong FC players